The Kirkuk International Airport  is an airport located Kirkuk, Iraq. The airport officially opened in 20th October, 2022 for civil visitors.

Since 2003 the airport was used by the U.S. Air Force as a military airport. It was returned to the Iraqi Army in November 2011. In 2012, the Iraqi Transportation Ministry decided to move the military section to another location, a prerequisite for turning the air base into a civilian airport. According to the (Nazaha) committee, the government allocated 93.5 million dollars from the airport project.

History
At the onset of the Iran-Iraq War, Al-Hurriah was the main airbase use by the newly purchased Mirage F1s. It was bombed in Operation Sultan 10 in 1980 in the early phase of the war.

Kirkuk Regional Air Base was home to the 506th Air Expeditionary Group. The group maintained base security, conducted safe flying operations and actively supported base agencies in support of Operation Iraqi Freedom, Operation New Dawn, and other U.S. Air Forces Central and U.S. Central Command contingency plans.

Approximately 1,000 active-duty, Reserve and Guard Airmen were assigned to the 506th AEG during any given Air Expeditionary Force rotation. Additionally, approximately 5,000 soldiers are assigned to the installation, commonly known as Forward Operating Base Warrior. As of July 2011, the majority of these soldiers were assigned to the 1st Brigade Combat Team, U.S. 1st Infantry Division, and the U.S. 1st Cavalry Division.

The 506th AEG was the most forward deployed Air Force Group in Operation Iraqi Freedom. The heritage of the 506th AEG is tied to the famous 506th Fighter Group of World War II.

Among the base agencies the 506th AEG actively supports is the Kirkuk Provincial Reconstruction Team (PRT).

Airlines and destinations 
The airport reopened to civilian aircraft in 2022.

Location
Kirkuk RAB lies in northeastern region of Iraq in the outskirts of the city of Kirkuk, one of the largest metropolitan areas in Iraq.

References

External links

 Official Website

 KRAB Kronicle
 Kirkuk News

Installations of the United States Air Force in Iraq
Iraqi Air Force bases